Norway competed at the 1994 Winter Paralympics in Lillehammer, Norway. 43 competitors from Norway won 64 medals including 29 gold, 22 silver and 13 bronze and finished 1st in the medal table.

See also 
 Norway at the Paralympics
 Norway at the 1994 Winter Olympics

References 

Norway at the Paralympics
1994 in Norwegian sport
Nations at the 1994 Winter Paralympics